Michael Robinson (born March 3, 1986) is a former professional arena football and indoor football defensive end.

College career

Robinson attended Nassau Community College where he was a standout member of the football team. He was named a 2005 pre-season NJCAA honorable mention as a tight end by Rivals.com.

Professional career

Huntington Hammer
Robinson was selected with the first pick of the second round (7th Overall) by the Huntington Hammer in the 2011 UIFL Draft. Robinson enjoyed a great season with the Hammer, on his way to being named to the 1st Team All-UIFL as a defensive lineman.

Harrisburg Stampede
Robinson played in one game with the Harrisburg Stampede of the Southern Indoor Football League.

Erie Explosion
Robinson recorded 20 sacks in 12 games, earning him First Team All-UIFL honors. He also had 14.5 tackles for loss.

Kansas City Command
Michael's strong UIFL season earned him a call-up to the Kansas City Command, where he recorded five tackles and one sack in three games.

Pittsburgh Power
Robinson signed with the Pittsburgh Power with one week left in the 2013 regular season.

References

External links
Kansas City Command profile

1986 births
Living people
American football defensive ends
Huntington Hammer players
Erie Explosion players
Kansas City Command players
Philadelphia Soul players
Pittsburgh Power players
Players of American football from New York (state)
Lehigh Valley Steelhawks players
Harrisburg Stampede players
Nassau Lions football players
Nassau Community College alumni